This is a list of 144 genera in the family Ephydridae, shore flies.

Ephydridae genera

 Achaetorisa Papp, 1980 c g
 Actocetor Becker, 1903
 Allotrichoma Becker, 1896 i c g b
 Amalopteryx  Eaton, 1875
 Apulvillus Malloch, 1934
 Asmeringa Becker, 1903
 Athyroglossa Loew, 1860
 Atissa Haliday, 1837
 Austrocoenia Wirth, 1970
 Axysta Haliday, 1837
 Beckeriella Williston, 1897
 Brachydeutera Loew, 1862
 Callinapaea Sturtevant & Wheeler, 1954
 Calocoenia Mathis, 1975
 Cavatorella Deonier, 1995
 Centromeromyia Frey, 1958
 Cerobothrium Frey, 1958
 Cerometopum  Cresson, 1914 c g
 Ceropsilopa Cresson, 1917
 Chaetomosillus Hendel, 1934 c g
 Chlorichaeta Becker, 1922 i c g
 Cirrula Cresson, 1915
 Clanoneurum Becker, 1903
 Clasiopella Hendel, 1914
 Cnestrum Becker, 1896 c g
 Coenia Robineau-Desvoidy, 1830
 Cressonomyia Arnaud, 1958 i c g b
 Dagus Cresson, 1935 c g
 Dichaeta Meigen, 1830
 Diclasiopa Hendel, 1917 i c g
 Diedrops Mathis & Wirth, 1976
 Dimecoenia Cresson, 1916
 Diphuia  Cresson, 1944
 Discocerina Macquart, 1835
 Discomyza Meigen, 1830
 Ditrichophora Cresson, 1924 i c g
 Donaceus Cresson, 1943
 Dryxella Krivosheina, 2013
 Dryxo Robineau-Desvoidy, 1830
 Eleleides Cresson, 1948 c g
 Elephantinosoma Becker, 1903
 Ephydra Fallén, 1810
 Ephydrella Tonnoir & Malloch, 1926
 Eremomusca Mathis, 1985 c g
 Eremotrichoma Giordani Soika, 1956 c g
 Eutaenionotum Oldenberg, 1923 i c g
 Facitrichophora Mathis & Zatwarnicki, 2012 g
 Galaterina Zatwarnicki & Mathis, 2001 c g
 Garifuna Mathis, 1997
 Gastrops Williston, 1897
 Glenanthe Haliday, 1837
 Guttipsilopa Wirth, 1956
 Gymnoclasiopa Hendel, 1930 g
 Gymnopiella  Cresson, 1945 c g
 Halmopota Haliday, 1856 c g
 Haloscatella Mathis, 1979 g
 Hecamede Haliday in Curtis, 1837
 Hecamedoides Hendel, 1917 i c g
 Helaeomyia Cresson, 1941
 Homalometopus Becker, 1903
 Hoploaegis  Cresson, 1944
 Hostis Cresson i c g
 Hyadina Haliday, 1837
 Hydrellia Robineau-Desvoidy, 1830
 Hydrochasma  i c g
 Ilythea Haliday, 1837
 Isgamera Soika, 1956
 Karema Cresson, 1929
 Lamproclasiopa Hendel, 1933
 Lamproscatella Hendel, 1917 i c g
 Lemnaphila Cresson, 1933 (duckweed miner flies)
 Leptopsilopa Cresson, 1922
 Limnellia Malloch, 1925
 Lipochaeta Coquillett, 1896 i c g
 Lytogaster Becker, 1896 i c g
 Microlytogaster Cresson, 1924 i c g
 Mosillus Latreille, 1804
 Nannodastia Hendel i c g
 Neoephydra Mathis 2008
 Neoscatella Malloch, 1933 i g
 Nesopsilopa Mathis & Wirth, 1977 g
 Nostima Coquillett, 1900
 Notiocoenia Mathis, 1980
 Notiphila Fallén, 1810
 Ochthera Latreille, 1802
 Oedenopiforma Cogan, 1968 c g
 Oedenops Becker, 1903
 Omyxa Mathis & Zatwarnicki, 2002
 Orasiopa  c g
 Papuama Mathis & Zatwarnicki, 2002 c g
 Paracoenia Cresson, 1935 i c g
 Paraephydra Mathis 2008
 Paraglenanthe  c g
 Parahyadina  Tonnoir & Malloch, 1926
 Paralimna Loew, 1862
 Paratissa Coquillett, 1900
 Parydra Stenhammar, 1844
 Parydroptera Collin, 1913
 Pectinifer  Cresson, 1944
 Pelignellus Sturtevant & Wheeler, 1954
 Pelina Haliday, 1837
 Pelinoides Cresson, 1931
 Peltopsilopa  c g
 Philotelma Becker, 1896 i c g
 Philygria Stenhammar, 1844
 Physemops Cresson, 1934
 Placopsidella Kertész, 1901
 Platygymnopa Wirth, 1971
 Poecilostenia Bezzi, 1908 g
 Polytrichophora Cresson, 1924 i c g
 Pseudohecamede Hendel g
 Pseudohyadina  i c g
 Pseudopelina  c g
 Psilephydra Hendel, 1914
 Psilopa Fallén, 1823
 Psilopoidea Cresson, 1939 c g
 Ptilomyia Coquillett, 1900
 Rhinonapaea  i c g
 Rhychopsilopa  g
 Rhynchopsilopa Hendel, 1913 c g
 Rhysophora  i c g
 Risa Becker, 1907 c g
 Saphaea  c g
 Scatella Robineau-Desvoidy, 1830
 Scatophila Becker, 1896 i c g b
 Schema Becker, 1907 i c g
 Scoliocephalus Becker, 1903
 Scotimyza  c g
 Setacera Cresson, 1930 i c g b
 Sinops  c g
 Stratiothyrea Meijere, 1913
 Subpelignus Papp, 1983 c g
 Tauromima  c g
 Teichomyza Macquart, 1835
 Thinoscatella Mathis, 1979 g
 Thiomyia Wirth, 1954
 Trimerina Macquart, 1835
 Trimerinoides  i c g
 Trimerogaster  g
 Trimerogastra Hendel, 1914
 Trypetomima  c g
 Typopsilopa Cresson, 1916
 Zeros Cresson, 1943

Data sources: i = ITIS, c = Catalogue of Life, g = GBIF, b = Bugguide.net

References

Ephydridae